GSAT-12 is communication satellite designed and developed by the Indian Space Research Organisation. It is the second satellite to be launched and placed on a GTO using PSLV.

Satellite
GSAT-12 is considered to be a replacement of the aged satellite INSAT-3B. It will provide services like tele-education, tele-medicine, disaster management support and satellite internet access.

Payloads
GSAT-12 is equipped with 12 Extended C-band transponders.

Launch
GSAT-12 was launched onboard PSLV-XL C-17 from second launch pad of Satish Dhawan Space Centre on July 15, 2011. The tentative life of satellite is 8 years.

Mission Life and Replacement
GSAT-12 has exceeded its planned mission life and continues to operate. A replacement satellite CMS-01(formerly GSAT-12R) was launched on 17 December 2020.

Relocation 
GSAT-12 has been relocated from 83°E slot to 48°E slot on 19 March 2021.

References

GSAT satellites
Spacecraft launched in 2011
2011 in India